A McLeod tool (or rakehoe) is a two-sided blade — one a rake with coarse tines, one a flat sharpened hoe — on a long, wooden handle. It is a standard tool during wildfire suppression and trail restoration. The combination tool was created in 1905 by Malcolm McLeod, a United States Forest Service ranger at the Sierra National Forest.

The McLeod was originally designed to rake fire lines with the teeth and cut branches and sod with the sharpened hoe edge. It is also used for finishing and maintaining hiking trails.

Common issues 
Because of its large and sharp head, the McLeod is an awkward tool to transport and store, and is often considered undesirable. Some McLeod tools are made with a removable blade to partially mitigate this problem. Ideally, it is carried with the tines pointing toward the ground for safety, with a sheath over the cutting edge. The mass distribution makes it difficult to carry in this orientation consistently.

Desirable traits 
Despite the common issues stated above, the McCleod remains a favorite tool among many foresters for hand tool required ground work. The weight and balance of the McCleod allows for a more effective turf busting affect than its lighter weight counterparts. Furthermore, because of its head design, the tool can be stood upright without needing to penetrate the soil, allowing for a safer "standby" configuration reducing tripping hazards and increasing visibility thus effectively reducing the chances that the tool is lost in the woods.

See also 
 Driptorch
 Fire flapper (tool)
 Flare
 Halligan tool
 Pulaski (tool)
 Fire rake

Notes 

Wildfire suppression equipment
Forestry tools
American inventions